Alyas Pusa: Ang Taong May 13 Buhay is a 1988 Filipino action film directed by Pablo Santiago and starring Ramon Revilla, Alona Alegre, Angela Perez, Paquito Diaz, and Fred Moro. It employs Revilla's usual formula of having his character own a protective amulet in battle. Produced by Urban Films, the film was released on April 13, 1988. Alyas Pusa was given a positive review by critic Lav Diaz, who praised its neutral depiction of ideological conflicts between communist rebels and anti-communist soldiers, though he doubted the believability of the film's premise.

Cast
Ramon Revilla as Lieutenant Teofilo "Pilo"
Alona Alegre
Angela Perez
Paquito Diaz as Brando
Fred Moro
Jose Romulo
Johnny Vicar
Lucita Soriano
Joseph de Cordova
Vic Varrion
Robert Miller
Ernie David
Eddie Samonte
Bebeng Amora
Marlon Borinaga
Danny Terrante
Jun Perez

Themes
Alyas Pusa is a continuation of Ramon Revilla's formula of portraying notorious or real-life characters who protect themselves with amulets ("anting-anting") in battle, sustaining a traditional belief of native Filipinos which has endured to contemporary times.

Critical response
Lav Diaz, writing for the Manila Standard, questioned the believability of the film's premise, as he doubted that a communist rebel from the New People's Army would hand over an amulet to Revilla's character. Despite this, he praised the film's neutral and clear illustration of the conflicting ideologies between rebels and soldiers as reflected in reality, accidental or otherwise. He also commended the performances of Alona Alegre and Angela Perez.

References

External links

1988 films
1988 action films
Filipino-language films
Philippine films about revenge
Films directed by Pablo Santiago
Philippine action films